Bamako is a 2006 film directed by Abderrahmane Sissako, first released at the 2006 Cannes Film Festival on 21 May and in Manhattan by New Yorker Films on 14 February 2007.

The film depicts a trial taking place in Bamako, the capital of Mali, amid the daily life that is going on in the city. In the midst of that trial, two sides argue whether the World Bank and International Monetary Fund are guided by special interest of developed nations, or whether it is corruption and the individual nations' mismanagement, that is guilty of the current financial state of many poverty-stricken African countries as well as the rest of the poor undeveloped world. The film even touches on European colonization and discusses how it plays a role in shaping African societies and their resulting poverty and issues.

Danny Glover, one of the film's executive producers, also guest-stars as an actor in a Western film (called Death in Timbuktu) that some children are watching on the television in one scene.

Lawyers William Bourdon and Aïssata Tall Sall portrayed themselves in the film.

Accolades 
Actress Aïssa Maïga was nominated for the César Award for Most Promising Actress in 2007.

Bamako was the recipient of the first Film Award of the Council of Europe (FACE) given at the Istanbul International Film Festival in April 2007.

Bamako won the award for Best French-Language Film/Meilleur Film Francophone at the Prix Lumière.

Bamako was also the winner of the Audience Award at the Paris Cinema in 2006.

Salon critic Andrew O'Hehir selected the film when asked to present one film within the Maryland Film Festival in 2008.

Reception 

The film received a Metacritic score of 81 out of 100 which meant the film was met with critical acclaim. The film has a score of 85% with a certified "Fresh" rating on Rotten Tomatoes based on 54 reviews with the following consensus: "A courtroom drama and a portrait of everyday Mali life, Bamako approaches both subjects with equal skill and success." The film received much praise for its direction by Sissako.

Entertainment Weekly gave Bamako an A, calling it "a passionate, challenging drama from the fine Mauritanian writer-director Abderrahmane Sissako" and that it brings "moments of brimming, illogical, intimate neighborly dailiness the filmmaker also captures with warmth and infectious high spirits".

A. O. Scott from The New York Times said that "he has never seen a film quite like Bamako'''' and praised the director's vision as a "seething, complicated and a disarmingly beautiful investigation of Africa's social, economic and human crises" and goes on to describe the film as "something different, a work of cool intelligence and profound anger, a long, dense, argument that is also a haunting visual poem".

Michael Phillips of the Chicago Tribune in his review gave the film 3 1/2 stars out of 4 and said "Sissako has an unusual camera eye, patient and alert to the ebb and flow of both the courtroom sequences and the outside scenes. The music is wonderful as well."

Wesley Morris from the Boston Globe in an overwhelmingly positive review said "As demonstrated in his previous film, a plangent snapshot of subsistence called "Waiting for Happiness," Sissako is a poet, and the filmmaking in this new picture is stuff of a deserving laureate."

The Empire review gave the film 4 out of 5 stars and said that the film is "Far from an easy watch, either in terms of its hard-hitting content, seemingly haphazard structuring or its dense symbolism. But this makes sense of the political intricacies by balancing the rhetoric and statistics with everyday occurrences that give the iniquities and inadequacies a human face."

The review in The Washington Post said "No one can deny the powerful reality that weaves its way through Bamako."

See also
 Life and Debt Black Gold Confessions of an Economic Hit Man''

References

External links
 
 
 
 
 
 Danny Glover talks about Bamako
 Bamako Film Summary and Critique at DVD Outsider

2006 films
Bambara-language films
2006 drama films
French drama films
2000s French-language films
Malian drama films
Films directed by Abderrahmane Sissako
Films set in Mali
Best French-Language Film Lumières Award winners
2000s French films
2006 multilingual films
French multilingual films